Povetkin is a Russian masculine surname, its feminine counterpart is Povetkina. Notable people with the surname include:

 Alexander Povetkin (born 1979), Russian boxer 
Stepan Povetkin (1895–1965), Soviet general

Russian-language surnames